The 2022 UC Davis football team represented the University of California, Davis as a member of the Big Sky Conference during the 2022 NCAA Division I FCS football season. Led by sixth-year head coach Dan Hawkins, the Aggies played their home games at UC Davis Health Stadium in Davis, California.

Previous season

The Aggies finished the 2021 season 8–4 with a mark of 5–3 in conference play, tying for fifth place in the Big Sky. UC Davis received an at-large bid to the NCAA Division I Football Championship playoff, where they lost to South Dakota State in the first round.

Preseason

Polls
On July 25, 2022, during the virtual Big Sky Kickoff, the Aggies were predicted to finish fifth in the Big Sky by both the coaches and media.

Preseason All–Big Sky team
The Aggies had three players selected to the preseason all-Big Sky team.

Offense

Ulonzo Gilliam, Jr.  – WR

Connor Pettek – C

Jake Parks – G

Schedule

Game summaries

at California

at No. 2 South Dakota State

San Diego

No. 12 Weber State

at No. 4 Montana State

Northern Arizona

at Northern Colorado

Cal Poly

Idaho State

at No. 15 Idaho

at No. 2 Sacramento State

Ranking movements

References

UC Davis
UC Davis Aggies football seasons
UC Davis Aggies football